KKPD-LD, virtual and UHF digital channel 30, is a low-powered QVC2-affiliated television station licensed to Tyler, Texas, United States. The station is owned by HC2 Holdings.

History 
The station's construction permit was issued on February 25, 2010 under the calls of K30KP-D, and moved to the current callsign of KKPD-LD.

Digital channels
The station's digital signal is multiplexed:

References

External links

Low-power television stations in the United States
Innovate Corp.
Television stations in Texas
Television channels and stations established in 2020
2020 establishments in Texas